Andreas Schmidt (born 22 September 1959) is a German former swimmer who competed in the 1976 Summer Olympics and in the 1984 Summer Olympics.

References

1959 births
Living people
Sportspeople from Düsseldorf
German male swimmers
German male freestyle swimmers
Olympic swimmers of West Germany
Swimmers at the 1976 Summer Olympics
Swimmers at the 1984 Summer Olympics
World Aquatics Championships medalists in swimming
European Aquatics Championships medalists in swimming
Universiade medalists in swimming
Universiade bronze medalists for West Germany
Medalists at the 1983 Summer Universiade
20th-century German people
21st-century German people